The Rwakayihura famine was a major famine which affected Ruanda-Urundi between 1928 and 1929. It was particularly acute in central and eastern Ruanda where its effects continued until 1930. It is believed to have caused tens of thousands of deaths.

Further reading

Famines in Africa
History of Rwanda
Ruanda-Urundi
1928 in Africa
1929 in Africa
1930 in Africa
20th-century famines